Viktar Martinowich (born ) is a Belarusian writer, journalist, and art critic.

Biography 
Martinowich was born in Ashmyany. In 1999 he graduated from the Faculty of Journalism of Belarusian State University (BSU) in 2002 and obtained a PhD from BSU with a thesis about the Vitebsk avant-garde in Soviet newspapers in the 1920s.

From 2002 to 2015, he was a deputy editor-in-chief of the BelGazeta.
On June 27, 2008, at the Vilnius Academy of Arts (Lithuania), he defended his PhD thesis on the topic "Vitebsk avant-garde (1918-1922): socio-cultural context and art criticism". He teaches at the European Humanities University.

In October–December 2014, he was engaged in research work at the Institute for the Humanities in Vienna where, within the framework of the Milena Jesenská Fellowship for Journalists, he prepared a work about the Vitebsk period  of Marc Chagall.

His first fiction book was published in 2009. Later his books received attention and received awards from Belarusian and Russian literature societies.

A film based on the book Vozera radasti (Lake of Happiness) was made in 2019.

In 2021, during the 2020-2021 Belarusian protests, 558 copies of his last book, Revolution, were confiscated. At the same time, Belarusian customs forbad mailing the book to any other country.

Bibliography 
 Рэвалюцыя (Revolution). Knihazbor, Minsk 2020, 
 Ноч (Night), Knihazbor, Minsk 2018, 
 Родина. Марк Шагал в Витебске (Homeland. Marc Chagall in Vitebsk). NLO, Moskau 2017, 
 Возера радасці (Lake of Happiness). Knihazbor, Minsk 2016, 
 Мова 墨瓦 (Mova). Knihazbor, Minsk 2014, 
 Cфагнум (Sphagnum). Knihazbor, Minsk 2013, 
 Сцюдзёны вырай (Icy paradise). Piarshak, Minsk 2011
 Паранойя (Paranoia). AST, Moskau 2009,

References

External links 
 Interview for Belarusian media
 Interview for Deutsche Welle about 2020 Belarusian protests

Living people
Belarusian journalists
Belarusian writers
Belarusian essayists
Belarusian-language writers
Russian-language writers
21st-century Belarusian writers
Year of birth missing (living people)